Keala Joan Settle (born November 5, 1975) is an American actress and singer. Settle originated the role of Norma Valverde in Hands on a Hardbody, which ran on Broadway in 2013, and was nominated for the Outer Critics Circle Award, Drama Desk Award, and Tony Award for Best Featured Actress in a Musical. In 2016 she was in the original Broadway cast of Waitress portraying Becky. In 2017, she portrayed Lettie Lutz, a bearded lady, in the musical film The Greatest Showman. The song "This Is Me" from the film, principally sung by Settle, won the 2017 Golden Globe Award for Best Original Song, and was nominated for the Academy Award for Best Original Song. On January 27, 2019, Settle sang "Seasons of Love" in Fox's Rent: Live.

Personal life
Settle was born in Hawaii, the oldest of five children of Susanne (née Riwai), who is of Māori (Rangitāne, Ngāti Kahungunu) descent from New Zealand, and British-born David Settle. She is a graduate of Kahuku High School (class of 1994), and an alumna of Southern Utah University.

Career

Broadway
Settle made her Broadway debut in 2011 in Priscilla, Queen of the Desert as Shirley and in the ensemble.

Settle originated the role of Norma Valverde in Hands on a Hardbody, a musical which ran briefly on Broadway in 2013, and is based on the 1997 documentary about real people competing to win a new truck. The TheatreMania reviewer wrote: "Settle, as Norma, steals every scene she's in. The spectacularly bizarre lead-in to her big number, 'Joy of the Lord,' is more difficult to pull off than most Shakespearean monologues, and her solo vocals reveal a soulful, oversized gospel range that drives the Holy Spirit straight to the back of the theater. When she tearfully realizes what her faith in God may have wrought, it stings like a chigger bite. Settle's touching performance should go on the shortlist for every Best Featured Actress prize in town." For this role, Settle was nominated for the Outer Critics Circle, Drama Desk, and Tony Award for Best Featured Actress in a Musical. Additionally, she was awarded the Theatre World Award for Outstanding Broadway or Off-Broadway debut performance during the 2012-13 theatrical season.

Settle played the role of Madame Thenardier in the revival of Les Misérables, starting in March 2014, and ending on March 1, 2015.

Settle originated the role of Becky in the musical Waitress, which opened on Broadway on April 24, 2016, at the Brooks Atkinson Theatre after premiering at the American Repertory Theater in August 2015.

Other work
Settle played the role of Tracy Turnblad in the national tour of Hairspray. In the review of the tour stop at the Kennedy Center in 2005, the Washington Post reviewer wrote: "As for Settle, she is a fine Tracy, even if she looks too old for graduate school, let alone high school." She appeared in the national tour of the Lincoln Center production of South Pacific as Bloody Mary, starting in 2009. The reviewer for the Pioneer Press, Massachusetts, wrote: "Better cast is Keala Settle, who plays the conniving Tonkinese trader lady Bloody Mary with a rolling gait, the venom of viper and—buried deeply but achingly visible in strategic moments—the maternal fierceness of a lioness."

In November through December 2012, Settle played the role of Mrs. Fezziwig in the Pioneer Theatre Company (Salt Lake City) production of the musical A Christmas Carol.

She played the role of the Narrator in Joseph and the Amazing Technicolor Dreamcoat at the Ogunquit Playhouse, Ogunquit, Maine from July 31 to August 25, 2013.

Settle discussed her career path, noting that "I really am not a musical theatre performer. I'm more an R&B singer and have been doing that my whole life. My mother is—well, was—also an R&B singer, in New Zealand....I was too busy wanting to sing backup or doing studio work singing chorus stuff, and singing backup for Gladys Knight in Vegas." Further, after her run in Hairspray, she stated that she "didn't know how to live in that world..." and so for several years worked backstage with designers until she was cast in South Pacific.

In 2017, Settle portrayed Lettie Lutz, a bearded lady, in the biographical musical drama film The Greatest Showman, alongside Hugh Jackman, Zac Efron, and Zendaya. The song "This Is Me" from the film, principally sung by Settle, won the 2018 Golden Globe Award for Best Original Song and was nominated for the Academy Award for Best Original Song. On December 22, 2017, she released an extended play entitled Chapter One.

In 2018, she was featured in Forbidden, the newest Todrick Hall visual album, especially in the song called "Forbidden", a song against homophobia.

In 2019, Settle played the role of Cy (a gender-flipped version of Paul from the original, also combined with soloist 1) in Fox's Rent: Live.

Also in 2019, Settle toured with  Hugh Jackman during his The Man. The Music. The Show. concerts globally, performing the song "This Is Me" from The Greatest Showman. On this tour Settle performed her original song Harder to a live audience for the very first time.

She performed "This Is Me" at the 2021 Royal Variety Performance. In January 2022, it was announced that Settle would make her West End debut performing the role of Angelique/Nurse in the musical & Juliet for a three-month run from March 29 to June 18, 2022.

Settle made her pantomime debut in 2022, playing the role of Fairy Sugarsnap in Jack and the Beanstalk at the Royal Derngate Theatre, Northampton.

Filmography

Television

Film

Video games

Theatre credits

Discography

Soundtrack albums

Extended plays

Singles

Other charted songs

Other appearances

Notes

References

External links
 
 
@TheKealaSettle at TikTok

American stage actresses
American women singers
Living people
1975 births
Actresses from Hawaii
People from Laie
American people of Māori descent
American people of English descent
Southern Utah University alumni
21st-century American actresses
American film actresses
American Latter Day Saints
American television actresses
Theatre World Award winners
Singers from Hawaii
Ngāti Kahungunu people
Rangitāne people